Sergiu Istrati (born 7 August 1988) is a Moldovan footballer who plays as a forward for Milsami Orhei.

Career
He signed for Milsami Orhei in summer 2021.

References

External links
 
 
 

1988 births
Living people
Moldovan footballers
Moldova international footballers
Association football forwards
FC Rapid Ghidighici players
FC Sfîntul Gheorghe players
FC Milsami Orhei players
FC Academia Chișinău players
FC Saxan players
FC Spicul Chișcăreni players
FC Brașov (1936) players
CSM Focșani players
Moldovan Super Liga players
Liga II players
Liga III players
Moldovan expatriate footballers
Expatriate footballers in Romania
Moldovan expatriate sportspeople in Romania